D. N. Jeevaraj is an Indian politician associated with Bharatiya Janata Party in Karnataka. He is currently serving as Political Secretary to the Chief Minister of Karnataka along with M. P. Renukacharya since 1 October 2020.

Political career 
D. N. Jeevaraj entered mainstream politics by contesting 1994 Karnataka election from Sringeri. He lost the election against H. G. Govinda Gowda of Janata Dal. He contested from Sringeri again in 1999 Karnataka election and lost to D. B. Chandregowda who had contested from the ticket of Indian National Congress.

In 2004 he defeated sitting MLA D. B. Chandregowda by a margin of 18,221 votes and was consecutively re-elected in 2008 and 2013. He was sworn in as a Minister in the Jagadish Shettar ministry and allotted the department of Food, Civil Supplies & Consumer Affairs, a post which he held till the Jagadish Shettar led Govt lost power to the Indian National Congress in the 2013 Karnataka Legislative Assembly election.

He lost the 2018 Karnataka Legislative Assembly election from Sringeri to T. D. Rajegowda of Congress with a meagre margin of 1989 votes. He was appointed Political Secretary to the Chief Minister of Karnataka B. S. Yediyurappa on 19 December 2020 after S. R. Vishwanath resigned. On 30 September 2021 Basavaraj Bommai re-appointed him as his Political Secretary, despite the fact that  Bommai himself had relieved him of this responsibility.

References 

21st-century Indian politicians
Living people
Karnataka MLAs 2004–2007
Karnataka MLAs 2008–2013
Karnataka MLAs 2013–2018
Bharatiya Janata Party politicians from Karnataka
1964 births